AASRA (stylized: आसRa) is a Mumbai-based mental health NGO which is noted for operating a 24-hour Helpline to cater to suicidal and emotionally distressed individuals. The service is an offshoot of Befrienders Worldwide and Samaritans, whose India chapter was established in 1960.

References

External links
 

Mental health organisations in India
Organisations based in Mumbai
1998 establishments in Maharashtra
Organizations established in 1998